The Astronomical Society of Edinburgh (ASE) is an association of amateur astronomers and other individuals interested in astronomy, which is based in Edinburgh, Scotland. The objectives are to encourage astronomical study and observation and to increase popular interest in astronomy.

History 
The ASE was founded in 1924 as the Edinburgh Astronomical Association; it changed its name in 1937. The founding president was John McDougal Field, who was also deputy to the City Astronomer William Peck at the City Observatory on Calton Hill. At that time, the honorary presidents were Peck and the Astronomer Royal for Scotland, Ralph Allan Sampson. Field continued to run the City Observatory after Peck's death in 1925.

The painter John Henry Lorimer was a member and vice president from 1930 to 1933. Upon his death in 1936, the ASE inherited the bulk of his estate. The ASE created the Lorimer Medal, connected to a series of high-profile public lectures.

Field died in 1937, which led to an arrangement with the Edinburgh Corporation for the ASE to have a free lease of the Calton Hill Observatory and for a grant to the ASE to operate the observatory. This arrangement continued until 2009. In 1953, the ASE moved its own base and venue for its lectures and meetings from the Royal Scottish Geographical Society at Randolph Crescent to the Calton Hill Observatory.

Affiliations 
The society is a member of the Federation of Astronomical Societies and is a registered Scottish charity (Charity Number SC022968).

Honorary Presidents 
There are usually two Honorary Presidents, one of them the Astronomer Royal for Scotland. The current holders of the positions are:
Prof. Catherine Heymans, the Astronomer Royal for Scotland, and Professor of Astrophysics at the University of Edinburgh
Prof. Andrew Lawrence, Regius Professor of Astronomy at the University of Edinburgh

See also 
 List of astronomical societies

References 

Amateur astronomy organizations
British astronomy organisations
Astronomical observatories in Scotland
Calton Hill
Charities based in Edinburgh
Clubs and societies in Edinburgh
Organisations based in Edinburgh
Scientific organisations based in Scotland
1924 establishments in Scotland
Scientific organizations established in 1924